This is a list of songs by American pop rock band Maroon 5.

Original songs

Covers

Unreleased songs

Featured songs

Kara's Flowers

Covers

Original songs
As Kara's Flowers

Stagg Street Recordings
 "If You Only Knew" – 3:26
 "The Fog" – 4:42
 "Simple Kind of Lovely" – 3:24
 "The Great Getaway" – 4:13
 "Good at Being Gone" – 3:05
 "Not Falling Apart" – 2:15
 "The Kid with the Velvet Eyes" – 5:13
 "As Things Collide" – 3:50
 "Everyday Goodbyes" – 4:01
 "A Day in the Life (Out-take)" – 1:14
We Like Digging?
 "Peeler" — 4:41
 "Give Me Love" — 4:14
 "Mental Mind Fuck" — 4:35
 "Stable" — 4:17
 "Ray Pim" — 2:48
 "Leave a Message" — 6:14
 "Miner" — 5:01
 "Dame Cabeza" — 4:26
 "Clomb" — 2:08
 "Genius" — 5:29
 "Untitled" — 12:58
Four-Track Demonstrations
 "Someone More Comfortable"
 "Vanessa"
 "Spoke with Kate (and She Said)"
 "If You Only Knew" (Acoustic Version)
 "The Kid with the Velvet Eyes" (Acoustic Version)
 "A Piano and Guitar Jam"
 "Shayanni's Surprise"
 "Feeling Slow"
 "The Sentimental Programmer"
Room #222 Demos
 "On My Show"
 "Angela"
 "Dreammaker #222"
 "Need Some Fun"
The Fourth World B-Sides
 "Angel in Blue Jeans"
 "Come Talk with Me"
 "Grave Condition"
 "The Powers That Be"
 "Buddy "Two Shoes" Wilson"
 "Yesterday, When I Was Handsome"
 "Good Evening, Dr. Nothing"
 Other songs (1999)
 "July"
 "However, Whatever"
 "Just Tell Me One Thing"
 "Give My Life"
 "Keep Your Head"
 "These Days"
 "Ragdoll"
 "Creation"
 RCA Demos (2000)
 Locked Up
 Chilly Winter
 Funky

As Maroon 5

V (Unreleased-reissue edition)
 "Forgive Me" 
 "Heat of the Moment" 
 "Keep Keeping Me Waiting"
"She Smiles So Sad" 
 "These Days"
 "Let It Go"

See also
Maroon 5 discography

Notes

References

Maroon 5